The 2018 American sports drama film Creed II, a sequel to Creed (2015) and the eighth installment in the Rocky franchise, was accompanied by two soundtrack albums. Creed II: The Album, featuring original songs produced by Mike Will Made-It, and Creed II: Original Motion Picture Soundtrack, featuring an original score composed by Ludwig Göransson, were both released on November 16, 2018.

Background
In March 2018, it was announced that Swedish composer Ludwig Göransson would score Creed II; the movie marks the first feature-length film collaboration between Göransson and director Steven Caple Jr. In October it was reported that  Mike Will Made-It will serve as the executive producer for the soundtrack to the film.

The soundtrack features songs that are heard in the film as well as others that are inspired by it.

Release
Mike Will Made It released the first single from the album, "Kill 'Em with Success", on November 5, 2018, in which he collaborated with fellow artists ScHoolboy, 2 Chainz and Eearz, shortly after a new trailer for the film was released. A second single, "The Mantra", is a collaboration with Pharrell and Kendrick Lamar and was released on November 14, 2018. On November 6, 2018 via Instagram, Mike Will announced the album listening party hosted by him. In a statement about the soundtrack, Mike Will said:

Track listing

Notes
  signifies an additional producer

Charts

Score album

Creed II: Original Motion Picture Soundtrack is the soundtrack album for the 2018 film Creed II, composed by Ludwig Göransson. It was released on November 16, 2018 through Sony Classical Records.

References

2018 soundtrack albums
2010s film soundtrack albums
Albums produced by Mike Will Made It
Mike Will Made It albums
Interscope Records soundtracks
Rocky (film series) soundtracks
Sony Classical Records soundtracks
Ludwig Göransson soundtracks